I'll Remember April may refer to:
 "I'll Remember April" (song), a 1942 popular song by Gene de Paul, lyrics by Patricia Johnston and Don Raye
 I'll Remember April (1945 film), starring Gloria Jean
 I'll Remember April (1999 film), a 1999 film by director Bob Clark